Žan Rudolf (born 9 May 1993) is a Slovenian track athlete who specializes in the 800 metres. He holds the Slovenian national record for the 800 metre discipline.

Running career
Rudolf, although still a teenager, ran the 800 metres at the 2012 European Athletics Championships. It was his first senior-level major competition appearance. A month later, he ran at the 2012 World Junior Championships in Athletics, where he made it to the semi-final round in the men's 800 metres. He won the 800 metre race at the 2013 Gugl Indoor Meeting, recording a time of 1:46.96 which remains the Gugl Indoor record as of 2014. Rudolf also ran the 800 metres at the 2013 European Indoor Championships, although did not qualify past the first round.

See also
Slovenia at the 2012 European Athletics Championships

References

External links
Youtube: Men's 800 m Tallinn European Junior Championships

1993 births
Living people
Sportspeople from Ljubljana
Slovenian male middle-distance runners
Athletes (track and field) at the 2010 Summer Youth Olympics
World Athletics Championships athletes for Slovenia
Athletes (track and field) at the 2016 Summer Olympics
Olympic athletes of Slovenia
Athletes (track and field) at the 2018 Mediterranean Games
Mediterranean Games competitors for Slovenia